The 2022 All-Ireland Minor Hurling Championship was the 92nd staging of the All-Ireland Minor Hurling Championship since its establishment by the Gaelic Athletic Association in 1928. The championship began on 5 March 2022 and ended on 3 July 2022.

Cork entered the championship as the defending champions, however, they were beaten by Clare in the Munster semi-final.

The All-Ireland final was played at Nowlan Park in Kilkenny on 3 July 2022 between Tipperary and Offaly, in what was their first meeting in a final in 35 years. Tipperary won the match by 1-17 to 1-16 to claim a record-equalling 21st championship title overall and their first title since 2016.

Ben Deegan from Laois was the championship's top scorer with 4-63.

Leinster Minor Hurling Championship

Tier 1

Tier 1 table

{| class="wikitable" 
!width=10|
!width=170 style="text-align:left;"|Team
!width=10|
!width=10|
!width=10|
!width=10|
!width=30|
!width=30|
!width=10|
!width=10|
|- style="background:#FFFFE0"
|1||align=left| Kilkenny||2||1||0||1||45||41||4||2
|- style="background:#FFFFE0"
|2||align=left| Dublin||2||1||0||1||52||52||0||2
|- style="background:#ccffcc" 
|3||align=left| Wexford||2||1||0||1||48||52||-4||2
|}

Tier 1 results

Tier 2

Tier 2 table

{| class="wikitable" 
!width=10|
!width=170 style="text-align:left;"|Team
!width=10|
!width=10|
!width=10|
!width=10|
!width=30|
!width=30|
!width=10|
!width=10|
|-  style="text-align:center; background:#ccffcc"
|1||align=left| Offaly||2||2||0||0||55||28||27||4
|-  style="text-align:center; background:#ace1af;"
|2||align=left| Laois||2||1||0||1||55||33||22||2
|-  style="text-align:center; background:#ace1af;"
|3||align=left| Kildare||2||0||0||2||18||57||-49||0
|}

Tier 2 results

Tier 3

Tier 3 table

{| class="wikitable" 
!width=10|
!width=170 style="text-align:left;"|Team
!width=10|
!width=10|
!width=10|
!width=10|
!width=30|
!width=30|
!width=10|
!width=10|
|-  style="text-align:center; background:#ace1af;"
|1||align=left| Antrim||5||4||1||0||109||64||45||9
|-  style="text-align:center; background:#ace1af;"
|2||align=left| Westmeath||5||3||1||1||127||73||54||7
|-  style="text-align:center; 
|3||align=left| Carlow||5||3||0||2||109||71||39||6
|-  style="text-align:center; 
|4||align=left| Meath||5||2||1||2||103||87||16||5
|-  style="text-align:center; 
|5||align=left| Down||5||1||1||3||75||109||-34||3
|-  style="text-align:center; 
|6||align=left| Derry||5||0||0||5||41||160||-119||0
|}

Preliminary quarter-finals

Quarter-finals

Semi-finals

Final

Munster Minor Hurling Championship

Group 1
{| class="wikitable" 
!width=10|
!width=170 style="text-align:left;"|Team
!width=10|
!width=10|
!width=10|
!width=10|
!width=30|
!width=30|
!width=10|
!width=10|
!Qualification
|- style="background:#FFFFE0"  
|1||align=left| Tipperary||2||2||0||0||44||36||8||4
|Advance to Semi-Finals
|- style="background:#cfc"  
|2||align=left| Clare||2||1||0||1||38||30||8||2
| rowspan="2" |Advance to Quarter-Finals
|- style="background:#cfc"  
|3||align=left| Waterford||2||0||0||2||34||50||-16||0
|}

Group 1 results

Group 2
{| class="wikitable" 
!width=10|
!width=170 style="text-align:left;"|Team
!width=10|
!width=10|
!width=10|
!width=10|
!width=30|
!width=30|
!width=10|
!width=10|
!Qualification
|- style="background:#FFFFE0"  
|1||align=left| Cork||2||2||0||0||67||31||36||4
|Advance to Semi-Finals
|- style="background:#cfc"  
|2||align=left| Limerick||2||1||0||1||59||37||22||2
| rowspan="2" |Advance to Quarter-Finals
|- style="background:#cfc"  
|3||align=left| Kerry||2||0||0||2||15||73||-58||0
|}

Group 2 results

Quarter-finals

Semi-finals

Final

All-Ireland Minor Hurling Championship

All-Ireland quarter-finals
{| class="wikitable" 
!width=10|
!width=170 style="text-align:left;"|Team
!width=10|
!width=10|
!width=10|
!width=10|
!width=30|
!width=30|
!width=10|
!width=10|
!Qualification
|- style="background:#ccffcc"
|1||align=left| Galway||2||2||0||0||48||29||19||4
| rowspan="2" |Advance to Semi-Finals
|- style="background:#ccffcc" 
|2||align=left| Clare||2||1||0||1||30||40||-10||2
|-
|3||align=left| Laois||2||0||0||2||35||44||-9||0
|}

All-Ireland quarter-final fixtures

All-Ireland semi-finals

All-Ireland final

Championship statistics

Top scorers

Top scorers overall

In a single game

Miscellaneous

 Laois beat Kilkenny in the Leinster Championship for the first time since 1964.
 The Munster final was decided by penalty shootout for the first time ever.
 Offaly won their first Leinster Championship title since 2000.
 Galway's quarter-final group stage game against Clare in Athenry was their first home game since 1966.
 Offaly qualified for the All-Ireland final for the first time since 1989.

Awards
The GAA Minor Star Hurling Team of the Year was announced on 9 August. Offaly’s Adam Screeney was named as the Player of the Year.

1. Donagh Fahy (Galway)
2. Ciarán Flynn (Laois)
3. James Mahon (Offaly)
4. Eoghan Gunning (Clare)
5. Sam O’Farrell (Tipperary)
6. James Hegarty (Clare)
7. Donal Shirley (Offaly)
8. Rory Burke (Galway) 
9. Adam Daly (Tipperary)
10. Ben Deegan (Laois)
11. Dan Ravenhill (Offaly) 
12. Paddy McCormack (Tipperary)
13. Aaron Niland (Galway)
14. Tom Delaney (Tipperary)
15. Adam Screeney (Offaly)

References

External links
 Leinster MHC fixtures and format
 Munster MHC fixtures and results

Minor
All-Ireland Minor Hurling Championship